Monarchism in Mexico is the political ideology that defends the establishment, restoration, and preservation of a monarchical form of government in Mexico. Monarchism was a recurring factor in the decades during and after Mexico's struggle for independence. 

Beginning in 1808, it was unclear near the ending of the kingdom of the Viceroyalty of New Spain what form of government—monarchical or republican—might replace the absolutism of Ferdinand VII of Spain, but the default position in that era was monarchy.  In 1821, Mexico declared the Independence of the Mexican Empire. However, lacking a prince to ascend the Throne of Mexico, Agustín de Iturbide, a criollo royalist general who made an alliance with the insurgents for independence, was proclaimed president of the Regency. His Plan of Iguala united factions for independence and envisioned a sovereign nation, with the stated hope that new state would be led by a member of the Spanish royal family or a prince from another European royal house. 

In the absence, still, of a willing or unprohibited candidate from an established royal house, Iturbide was elected Emperor of Mexico by the Mexican congress in 1822 as Agustín I. Conflicts between congress and the emperor, coupled with the emperor's struggle to pay the military which propped up his regime led to empire's collapse. The emperor abdicated and went into exile in 1823. Mexico established a federated republic under the Constitution of 1824, but the idea of monarchy continued among Mexican conservatives.

Largely discredited in the wake of the First Mexican Empire’s fall, monarchism remained dormant until the 1840s when select conservative thinkers, including Lucas Alamán, began to publicly explore the idea as a means of giving the nation a stability which it had never found as a federated or centralized republic. Conservatives continued to hope that monarchy was a viable solution to Mexico's political turmoil by inviting a European prince to assume the Mexican throne, following the precedent set by nations such as Great Britain, Greece, and Belgium, who elected their monarchs from different countries.

These ideas attracted interest in European courts, culminating in a French intervention in Mexico in 1861, with the aim of helping the Mexican Conservative party establish a Mexican monarchy, this time with Archduke Maximilian of Austria as emperor. The idea of monarchy gained increasing Mexican support following the military defeat of conservatives in the War of the Reform, sparked by the promulgation of the liberal Constitution of 1857. The victorious liberal government of Benito Juárez suspended payment to bond holders, which gave European powers the pretext to intervene militarily for debt collection. In these circumstances, Mexican conservatives invited Archduke Maximilian to become emperor as French forces of Napoleon III invaded central Mexico. The establishment of the Empire by French troops, with support of Mexican Imperial forces, tainted the imperial regime's legitimacy from the start. This was further compounded by the fact that Juárez never left the national territory and was considered the legitimate head of state by the United States. Mexican conservatives expected the monarch to adhere to conservative principles, but Emperor Maximilian was politically a liberal and ratified many of the reforms of the liberal republican government that his regime displaced. The Second Mexican Empire was established when the U.S. was engaged in its civil war (1861-65), and with its end could give material support to Juárez's republican forces. With Napoleon III's withdrawal of French forces in 1866-67, the Empire collapsed in 1867. Emperor Maximilian was captured, tried, and executed. His execution by firing squad of the Restored Republic marked the end of monarchism in Mexico.

The Spanish legacy
For over 300 years, the colony of New Spain was ruled by viceroys representing the King of Spain. Only three of the viceroys were ever born in Mexico, the rest having been born in Spain, and usually going back after a few years of ruling.

During this time, two royal houses ruled Mexico. The House of Habsburg ruled Mexico from the conquest up until the War of Spanish Succession in 1714 when control of Spain and her colonies passed over to the House of Bourbon which began a program of modernization known as the Bourbon reforms.

The first serious proposal for an independent Mexican monarchy came about after Spain's support for the successful American War of Independence, Count Aranda, one of the king's ministers proposed to King Charles IV the establishment of a Spanish Commonwealth with independent kingdoms in New Spain, Peru, and New Granada as a compromise between Spain's colonial interests and the strengthening trend of decolonization.

Monarchism and Mexican independence

Mexico gained its independence in 1821, under the leadership of Agustín de Iturbide who sought to revive the commonwealth idea through the Plan of Iguala, which stipulated for Mexico to be an independent monarchy, nonetheless with a monarch from the royal Spanish family. The plan was ratified by the Spanish viceroy Juan O'Donojú through the Treaty of Córdoba and commissioners were sent to Spain to offer the Mexican throne to a Spanish prince. The Spanish government however, rejected the matter out of fear that any concession in favor of Mexican independence would cause Spain to entirely lose its influence in Mexico, and under the false assumption that there was still a significant pro-Spanish party in Mexico.

After news of the rejection arrived in Mexico there were mass demonstrations in favor of elevating Iturbide to the throne, and congress held an extraordinary session on the matter. Within congress there were both monarchists and republicans, but monarchism at this point was divided at this point into two factions: those in favor of crowning Iturbide, and those who had not yet given up hopes on inviting a Spanish prince to the throne. On May 18, 1822, congress elected Agustín de Iturbide as Mexico's first Emperor.

It was around this time that José Joaquín Fernández de Lizardi wrote a monarchist pamphlet, endorsing the establishment of a constitutional monarchy under Iturbide, recognizing the debates going on at the time over the ideal form of government for Mexico, but also arguing that the form of government matter less than whether or not a government acts justly. Lizardi also published a pro-Iturbide newspaper known as Pensador Mexicano.

After his coronation, Iturbide alienated his supporters when in the struggles between congress and the crown, it became clearer that Iturbide wanted to totally dominate the legislature, betraying the ideal of a constitutional monarchy. The Emperor shut congress down and replaced it with a smaller body of loyal deputies. Iturbide's pretext for closing the legislature had been that congress had accomplished nothing in the eight months it had been in session, work on a constitution had not begun despite that being the main purpose for its convocation, and that the matters of justice and finance had been completely neglected. Nonetheless the emperor himself was unable to bring order into the finances of the nation, and the military began to grumble at their lack of pay. The military turned against Iturbide, and unable to defeat the insurrection, Iturbide reassembled congress, and offered his abdication in April, 1823 being exiled from the nation shortly after. When he attempted to return in 1824, Iturbide was captured and executed.

In 1828, Spain tried to reconquer Mexico, and the conservative paper El Sol pondered the Bourbonist cause, ultimately arguing that it was futile to join the Spaniards when popular opinion against Bourbon rule was overwhelming, and so it urged all its readers to unite patriotically against the Spanish intervention.

Gutiérrez Estrada's essay
The Republican system prevailed through the following decades, and the nation suffered much turmoil, including multiple coups, financial insolvency, and the loss of Texas.

In 1840, in the aftermath of the Federalist Revolt of 1840 which had led to twelve days of devastating fighting in the middle of the capital and substantial damage to the National Palace, José María Gutiérrez de Estrada published a pamphlet advocating a constitutional convention to examine what had gone wrong with the nation. He also argued that the convention ought to be given the power to suggest any form of government as a remedy for Mexico, and openly argued that in his own opinion a monarchy headed by a foreign prince was the best form of government for Mexico at the time.

He strongly criticized the notion that there was one ideal form of government for all nations and all circumstances and pointed out the troubles that liberals even in France were experiencing trying to set up republic in recent times. He also warned that the chaos Mexico was experiencing was inevitably leading to foreign intervention. He warned of a future American annexation of Mexico, and preferred to at least have the choice of selecting a foreign monarch who would have a vested interest in the success of Mexico.

The Mexican government reacted to the pamphlet by characterizing it as treasonous and as an incitement to civil war. Multiple refutations were penned. The publisher was imprisoned, and Gutierrez Estrada was exiled to Europe. Nonetheless, the Mexican–American War bore out some of Estrada's predictions, encouraging him in his continued campaign to establish a monarchy. One of Estrada's critics at the time, General Juan Almonte would later change his opinion on monarchy and become a key figure in the establishment of the Second Mexican Empire.

El Tiempo

In December 1845 at a time of rising tensions with the United States, Mariano Paredes led a coup against the government of José Joaquín Herrera. Paredes was known to have monarchist sentiments. When he assumed power, he praised the former Spanish administration of colonial New Spain, and implied that a monarchy would be beneficial for the nation. While a constituent congress was elected, monarchists in Mexico now launched the first serious campaign to establish a monarchy in the nation since the days of the First Empire. The Mexican minister to Spain was reported to have been given instructions to sound out the idea of a Bourbon restoration in Mexico at European courts.

In January 1846 Conservative politician Lucas Alamán began publishing the newspaper El Tiempo, which initially argued that Mexico must be willing to explore whatever form of government was most suitable for the nation. Its principal contributors were Alamán, Francisco Manuel Sánchez de Tagle, Manuel Díez de Bonilla, and José Hilario Elguero y Guisasola.

The newspaper blamed United States's influence for causing damage to Mexican political thought. The framers of the 1824 Constitution of Mexico copied the institutions of the United States, under the assumption that it was those institutions that were responsible for the wealth of the nation, but the periodical argued that the U.S. had great wealth even in colonial times, and that many monarchies in Europe were prosperous as well. They ascribed the wealth of the United States to their trade with Britain, and the continuation of such commercial links after independence. It was also argued that constitutions lack the power to create societies, but are rather the codifications of societal customs that have developed over time and that a constitution must fit the custom, character, and requirements of each nation. The paper eventually moved away from simply advocating that Mexico find a more suitable form of government and openly endorsed constitutional monarchy, arguing that liberty, democracy, and national development can exist well under such a state, as demonstrated by the leading nations of the time.

The liberal paper, La Reforma, began a back and forth dispute with El Tiempo, attempting to refute each of its points. The editors of La Reforma nonetheless welcomed discussion on the merits of monarchy, but warned El Tiempo'''s staff that a call for foreign intervention ought to be prosecuted as treason.

On 6 June 1846, President Paredes addressed the newly elected congress. The legislature was divided politically. In the face of the outbreak of the Mexican-American War, the U.S. invasion that had begun the previous April, Paredes did not pursue any monarchical project and openly endorsed republicanism. El Tiempo condemned him and shut down shortly afterward.

El Universal
Mexican political thinkers were in a state of exasperation following the international humiliation and dismemberment of the nation in by the United States in the Mexican–American War. The disaster of the war helped contribute to a resurgence in monarchism, to the point that in a letter between liberal thinkers José María Luis Mora and Mariano Otero, Otero opined that the monarchist party may have been triumphant in Mexico if the monarchy had not just been overthrown in France in the Revolution of 1848, thus influencing the political fashion in favor of republicanism.

In the aftermath of the Mexican–American War, the cause by El Tiempo was taken up by the newspaper El Universal, once again under the influence of Lucas Alamán. It began publication in Mexico City in November 1848. It featured many of the same contributors that had written for El Tiempo, but also added Rafael de Rafael, Ignacio Aguilar y Marocho, José Dolores Ulibarri, and Father Manuel de San Juan Crisóstomo Nájera. Much like El Tiempo, it took up the tactic of implying that monarchy was the best form of government for Mexico rather than outright stating it. Its articles tended to criticize the federal organization of the Mexican Republic, as established in the 1824 Constitution.

A political pamphlet surveying the various Mexican factions in 1851 recognized the monarchists, their ties to the Conservative Party, and the leadership of Lucas Alamán, but also dismissed their success as impossible due to the nearby example of a successful republic provided by the United States.

Alamán's last attempt
In 1853, a coup overthrew president Mariano Arista, and Lucas Alamán invited Santa Anna to assume the presidency of the nation, intending for him to hold power only until a foreign monarch could be found. Alamán was made Secretary of Foreign Relations, and he revealed his monarchist project to the French minister Andre Levasseur. The government established contact with José María Gutiérrez Estrada and granted him official diplomatic credentials, instructing him to start looking for a royal candidate among the courts of Britain, France, Austria-Hungary, and Madrid. Upon the suggestion of Estrada, another monarchist, Jose Maria Hidalgo was granted a diplomatic post in Spain in order to seek a Spanish candidate for the throne.

Lucas Alamán died on June 2, 1853, and in 1855, a liberal coup overthrew Santa Anna, and Estrada and Hidalgo lost official government recognition, and ending the official effort to seek a monarchy for Mexico. In the wake of the controversies that arose in the subsequent, liberal administration of Juan Álvarez, Antonio de Haro y Tamariz plotted to restore the House of Iturbide to the Mexican throne, and if there was a refusal from the pretender, Haro planned to assume the throne himself.

The French intervention

Estrada and Hidalgo continued their campaign for the establishment of a Mexican monarchy in spite of no longer having any government accreditation. Gutierrez met with Napoleon III in June 1857. Hidalgo regained an official diplomatic post with the Mexican government, but with no authority or instructions to pursue any monarchist project. The most important connection which Hidalgo made was with Eugénie de Montijo, a Spanish noblewoman who at this time was wife of Napoleon III. At a meeting in Biarritz in August, 1857 regarding Mexican-Spanish affairs, the French Empress expressed her opinion that the establishment of a monarchy could benefit Mexico. Hidalgo explained that such a project had been attempted in 1846 and in 1854. Montijo became enthusiastic about the idea of a Mexican monarchy, and began to lobby for the matter with her husband.

The Marquis de Radepont, while living in Mexico managing haciendas, became intrigued by the idea of a Mexican monarchy after hearing the idea supported by prominent Mexicans. He wrote an essay aimed at the French government explaining how this could come about with the support of France. He also argued that such a Mexican Empire could serve as a barrier to American expansion, comparing it to the European situation in which the Ottoman Empire was viewed as an important barrier to Russian expansion.

President of the Mexican Supreme Court at the time Luis de la Rosa expressed his support for a monarchy to French minister to Mexico, Jean Gabriac, but he died in 1856, putting an end to any potential role in the ongoing monarchical intrigues.

Gutiérrez Estrada and Hidalgo continued to lobby to Napoleon III on behalf of a potential monarchy, but Napoleon in 1857 responded that he had no pretext to intervene and did not wish to antagonize the United States.

In December 1859, the liberal government of Mexico signed the McLane–Ocampo Treaty, which if it were ratified by the United States Senate, the U.S. would gained significant concessions in Mexico. These included the perpetual right of transit across key routes in the nation and the right to protect such routes with military force. Newspapers in Europe and in the United States expressed astonishment at the magnitude of the concessions that had been made and opined that the treaty would turn Mexico into a protectorate of the United States. The treaty caused great concern in European courts, and was used by Mexican monarchist exiles to emphasize the importance of European intervention in Mexico to defend against American encroachment. No intervention in response to the treaty ever materialized and the treaty was rejected by the United States Senate on 30 May 1860, due to the tensions that were leading to the outbreak of the American Civil War (1861-65).

In July 1861, in response to a financial crisis, the Mexican government suspended payment of its foreign debt. France, Spain, and Great Britain agreed to militarily intervene, but only to settle the question of Mexico's debts. As the United States was embroiled in its civil war and unable to assert the Monroe Doctrine, Napoleon III had a pretext and a free hand to carry out the plans that had been laid out to him by Estrada, Hidalgo, and Radepont. The European expedition landed in Mexico in December 1861. Spain and Great Britain then withdrew once France's ulterior motives became known. The French invasion of Mexico began in April 1862.

The Mexican conservative press began a campaign to promote monarchist ideals. It was argued that Mexico would not lose its independence, since in their understanding the French only intended regime change, to exchange a presidency of the republic for a Mexican throne. The press also argued that an alliance with France would help Mexico better withstand the encroachment of the United States, which had gained vast Mexican territory in the Mexican American War (1846-48). The international legal theories of Vattel and Félice were used to defend the legality and justification for the French intervention.

After the capital was taken, a new government, friendly to the French cause was set up and resolved to invite Maximilian of Habsburg to be Emperor of Mexico. Maximilian accepted the crown in April 1864. While Maximilian was a well-intended reformer who did not fail to win Mexican supporters, his government having been established by foreign arms, lacked legitimacy, and was engaged throughout its entire existence in warfare against supporters of the overthrown Mexican republic. The United States also never recognized the Empire, and after the end of the Civil War, placed diplomatic pressure on France to leave the continent. The French acquiesced and began to leave in 1866. The Empire survived a few months more as Maximilian and his Mexican supporters engaged in a last stand against the Republicans. They were defeated however, and Maximilian along with his two leading Mexican generals were tried and executed in June 1867, putting an end to Mexican efforts at establishing a monarchical government.

 Contemporary monarchism 

Today, some anti-republican and anti-liberal political groups advocate for the return of the Mexican monarchy and the legitimacy of the Second Mexican Empire, such as the far-right Nationalist Front of Mexico, established in 2006. They reportedly gather every year in Querétaro to commemorate the execution of Emperor Maximilian and his generals.

 See also 
First Mexican Empire
Second Mexican Empire
Mexican nobility
Conservative Party (Mexico)

References 

Further reading
 O'Gorman, Edmundo. La supervivencia política novo-hispana. Reflexiones sobre el monarquismo mexicano. Mexico: CEH-Condumec, 1969.
 Pani, Erika. Para mexicanizar el Segundo Imperio. El imaginario de los imperialistas. Mexico: El Colegio de México, Instituto Dr. José María Luis Mora 2001. 
 Pani, Erika. "Republicans and Monarchists, 1848-1867" In A Companion to Mexican History and Culture, edited by William H. Beezley. Wiley-Blackwell 2011. 
Pani, Erika: "Dreaming of a Mexican Empire: The Political Projects of the 'Imperialist'", in: Hispanic American Historical Review, no. 65:1, pp. 19–49.
 
 Van Young, Eric. Stormy Passage: Mexico from Colony to Republic, 1750-1850''. Rowman and Littlefield 2022

Monarchism in Mexico
Political movements in Mexico